The 1991 South American Women's Football Championship (Campeonato Sudamericano de Fútbol Femenino 1991) was held in Maringá, Brazil between 28 April and 5 May 1991. It was the first staging of the South American Women's Football Championship and determined the CONMEBOL's single qualifier for the 1991 FIFA Women's World Cup.

Brazil won the tournament, that was played with only three teams: Brazil, Chile and Venezuela. Adriana was the tournament's top scorer, with four goals. Chile's Ada Cruz was elected as the best player.

In 1988, the Venezuelan Football Federation (FVF) had expressed interest in hosting the tournament.

Results
The tournament was set up in a round-robin format, where each team played one match against each of the other teams within the group. The first placed team in the group won the tournament and qualified for the 1991 FIFA Women's World Cup in China.

Two points were awarded for a win, one point for a draw, and no points for a loss.

 Tie-breaker
 If teams finish leveled on points, the following tie-breakers are used:
 greater goal difference in all group games;
 greater number of goals scored in all group games;
 winner of the head-to-head match between the teams in question;
 drawing of lots.

Final standings

Brazil won the tournament and qualified for the 1991 FIFA Women's World Cup.

Awards

Goalscorers
4 goals
 Adriana
1 goal

 Elane
 Márcia Taffarel
 Marisa
 Roseli
 Ada Cruz

Unknown goalscorers

: 4 additional goals
: 1 additional goal

References

External links
Table & results at RSSSF.com
Seleção Brasileira Feminina (Brazilian National Women's Team) 1986-1995 at RSSSF Brazil

Copa América Femenina tournaments
Women
1991 FIFA Women's World Cup qualification
International women's association football competitions hosted by Brazil
1991 in Brazilian football
South
1991 in Brazilian women's sport